Henry Hudson Regional High School is a comprehensive regional public high school and  school district for students in 7th through 12th grade from both Atlantic Highlands and Highlands in Monmouth County, New Jersey, United States. The school has been accredited by the Middle States Association of Colleges and Schools Commission on Elementary and Secondary Schools.

As of the 2021–22 school year, the school had an enrollment of 301 students and 38.8 classroom teachers (on an FTE basis), for a student–teacher ratio of 7.8:1. There were 42 students (14.0% of enrollment) eligible for free lunch and 14 (4.7% of students) eligible for reduced-cost lunch.

The New Jersey Department of Education classifies the district in District Factor Group "DE", the fifth-highest of eight groupings. District Factor Groups organize districts statewide to allow comparison by socioeconomic characteristics. From lowest socioeconomic status to highest, the categories are A, B, CD, DE, FG, GH, I and J.

History
Constructed at a cost of $1.3 million (equivalent to $ million in ), the school opened on September 10, 1962, with a dedication ceremony conducted on November 5 of that year. The school opened with 630 students in grades 7-12, replacing the former Atlantic Highlands High School.

The district's first superintendent was Henry Schiable, who served in the position until 1969.

Awards, recognition and rankings
The school was the 147th-ranked public high school in New Jersey out of 339 schools statewide in New Jersey Monthly magazine's September 2014 cover story on the state's "Top Public High Schools", using a new ranking methodology. The school had been ranked 101st in the state of 328 schools in 2012, after being ranked 121st in 2010 out of 322 schools listed. The magazine ranked the school 176th in 2008 out of 316 schools. The school was ranked 159th in the magazine's September 2006 issue, which surveyed 316 schools across the state. Schooldigger.com ranked the school tied for 190th out of 381 public high schools statewide in its 2011 rankings (a decrease of 1 positions from the 2010 ranking) which were based on the combined percentage of students classified as proficient or above proficient on the two components of the High School Proficiency Assessment (HSPA), mathematics (80.0%) and language arts literacy (91.6%).

Athletics
The Henry Hudson Regional High School Admirals compete in Division B Central of the Shore Conference, an athletic conference comprised of public and private high schools in Monmouth and Ocean counties along the Jersey Shore. The conference operates under the jurisdiction of the New Jersey State Interscholastic Athletic Association (NJSIAA). With 150 students in grades 10-12, the school was classified by the NJSIAA for the 2019–20 school year as Group I for most athletic competition purposes, which included schools with an enrollment of 75 to 476 students in that grade range. The school's co-op team with Keyport High School was classified by the NJSIAA as Group I South for football for 2018–2020.

The school participates as the host school / lead agency for joint cooperative cross country running, boys / girls tennis and winter track teams with Keyport High School, while Keyport is the host school for girls soccer, boys / girls volleyball and wrestling teams. These co-op programs operate under agreements scheduled to expire at the end of the 2023–24 school year.

The softball team made it to the Group I state championship game in 2015, losing to Cedar Grove High School in the tournament finals.

Notable alumni

 Jeff Anderson (born 1970), actor best known for being featured in Clerks and Clerks 2 as Randal Graves.
 Walt Flanagan (born 1967), co-host of Tell 'Em Steve-Dave!, manager of Jay and Silent Bob's Secret Stash, and star of Comic Book Men.
 Jeffrey Gluckstein (born 1993), individual and synchronized trampolinist who has represented the U.S. at international competitions.
 Steven Gluckstein (born 1990), trampoline athlete.
 Bryan Johnson (born 1967), co-host of the Tell Em' Steve-Dave! and star of Comic Book Men.
 Jason Mewes (born 1974), actor best known for playing the role of foul-mouthed drug dealer "Jay", the vocal half of Jay and Silent Bob.
 Kevin Smith (born 1970), screenwriter and film director, who is the silent half of Jay and Silent Bob.
 Jerry Vasto (born 1992), MLB pitcher for the Colorado Rockies.

Administration
Core members of the district's administration are:
Dr. Tara Beams, Superintendent
Janet Sherlock, Business Administrator
Kevin McCarthy, Principal

Compton serves jointly as Tri-District Superintendent of Schools for the Atlantic Highlands School District, the Highlands School District and the Henry Hudson Regional High School.

Board of education
The district's board of education, comprised of nine members, sets policy and oversees the fiscal and educational operation of the district through its administration. As a Type II school district, the board's trustees are elected directly by voters to serve three-year terms of office on a staggered basis, with three seats up for election each year held (since 2012) as part of the November general election. The board appoints a superintendent to oversee the district's day-to-day operations and a business administrator to supervise the business functions of the district. Seats on the board are allocated based on the population of the constituent municipalities, with five seats assigned to Highlands and four to Atlantic Highlands.

References

External links
Henry Hudson Regional High School

School Data for the Henry Hudson Regional High School, National Center for Education Statistics
DigitalSports Henry Hudson Homepage
Henry Hudson Regional Alumni Association
Greatschools data for Henry Hudson Regional High School

1962 establishments in New Jersey
Educational institutions established in 1962
Atlantic Highlands, New Jersey
Highlands, New Jersey
New Jersey District Factor Group DE
Public high schools in Monmouth County, New Jersey
School districts in Monmouth County, New Jersey
Public middle schools in New Jersey